Maryland Public Television (MPT) is the Public Broadcasting Service (PBS) member state network for the U.S. state of Maryland. It operates under the auspices of the Maryland Public Broadcasting Commission, an agency of the Maryland state government that holds the licenses for all PBS member stations licensed in the state.

Studios are located in the unincorporated community of Owings Mills in northwestern Baltimore County. MPT operates six full-power transmitters that cover nearly all of the state, plus Washington, D.C. and parts of Virginia, West Virginia, Delaware, and Pennsylvania.

History
WMPB (licensed to Baltimore) first signed on in 1969 as the first station of the Maryland Center for Public Broadcasting; it gained satellite stations in Salisbury, Hagerstown, and Annapolis between 1971 and 1975, resulting in a formation of a statewide public television network. The network adopted its current name in 1984. Maryland Instructional Television (Maryland ITV), a division of the State Department of Education, was also housed at the network until 1991. On July 4, 1987, WFPT (licensed to Frederick) signed on to fill coverage gaps in the outer Washington market, while WGPT in Oakland began operations to cover the extreme west of the state, much of which previously had no local television service at all.

About 1999, the network launched an afternoon Britcom programming block, Afternoon Tea, replacing children's programming. By 2009, MPT was airing kids' programming during the day on its MPT Select channel.

In September 2015, as part of budget cuts, MPT outsourced its master control operations to Public Media Management—a joint venture of Boston PBS member WGBH and Sony Corporation.

This PBS station is currently not yet subject to a logo change, as PBS changed its logo on November 4, 2019; Maryland Public Television may or may not change its logo in 2023.

Productions

Current regional productions
MPT Salutes Vietnam Veterans: Maryland Public Television salutes the men and women who served in the Vietnam era
Chesapeake Collectibles: weekly series featuring people and their collectibles  
Maryland Farm & Harvest: weekly series helping Marylanders learn more about agriculture 
Chesapeake Bay Week: week long series of programs in April dedicated to the Chesapeake Bay
Direct Connection: public affairs call-in show focusing on discussion and analysis of politics and the news
Outdoors Maryland: outdoors show highlighting the Mid-Atlantic region's diversity and beauty
State Circle: news and analysis program detailing Maryland's General Assembly proceedings
Ways to Pay for College: annual special on finding money for higher education
Your Money & Business: consumer-oriented business magazine
Artworks: regional arts updates and specials highlighting Maryland's culture and history
Our Town: a collection of documentaries showcasing different towns across Maryland

Nationally distributed productions
The McLaughlin Group (2019–) a weekly political affairs round table
Steven Raichlen's Project Smoke & Project Fire (2015–2019) outdoor cooking series with Steven Raichlen.
MotorWeek: (1981–present PBS) automotive magazine featuring new automotive technology and model reviews
Great Performances: Star-Spangled Spectacular: Music special commemorating 200th Anniversary of FSK's National Anthem
F.S. Key and the Song That Built America
Planet Forward: A special on energy, climate, and sustainability
For Love of Liberty: series telling the story of America's black servicemen
Music of Ireland: Welcome Home
National Geographic Bee
Veterans Day: A Musical Tribute
Space Racers: an animated children's television series about space and science
My Greek Table with Diane Kochilas: a cooking show focused on Greek cuisine hosted by Diane Kochilas
To Dine For with Kate Sullivan: features stories of creators and dreamers at their favorite restaurant Kate Sullivan

Regional documentaries and specials
Eatin' Oysters: Chesapeake Style! (2017) who's eating & shucking oysters, why they love them, and where to find the best.
Search for the USS Scorpion: (2017) Search for the Commodore Barney's Flotilla
Conowingo Dam: Power on the Susquehanna (2016) the dam's unique story and place in Maryland history
Eatin' Crabcakes: The Best I Ever Had: (2011) the ultimate crab cake treasure hunt
Potomac by Air: (2015) explores incredible natural and man-made history along our nation's river
Eatin' Crabs Chesapeake Style: (2008) a rollicking foray into the world of the blue crab, from dockside to table.
Distinctive Homes of the Chesapeake: (2013) opening the door to Maryland's magnificent homes surrounding the Chesapeake Bay
The Chesapeake Bay Bridge: Spanning the Bay (2014) an exciting look back at the monumental creation of the Bay Bridge

Past productions
A.M. Weather (1978–1995): a 15-minute daily program featuring detailed forecasts presented by NOAA meteorologists
Baking with Julia (1996-1998) a cooking series with Julia Child (PBS)
Barbecue University (2003–2006) outdoor cooking series with Steven Raichlen.
Bob the Vid Tech (1993–2010), children's specials and interstitials.
Coastal Cooking with John Shields (2005), 13 programs hosted by John Shields, distributed by American Public Television
Consumer Survival Kit (1970s), national PBS series.
Cooking in America with Pierre Franey (1991), series of 13 shows.
Cooking With Master Chefs (1993), 16 shows hosted by Julia Child.
Cuisine Rapide (1990), series of 13 cooking shows hosted by chef Pierre Franey.
Dessert Circus (1997), a cooking series featuring Jacques Torres.
Hodgepodge Lodge (1970s), a nature show for children hosted by Jean Worthley.
Jewish Cooking in America with Joan Nathan (1998–2002) (PBS)
Julia Child: Lessons With Master Chefs (2000–2011) (PBS)
Kratts' Creatures, (1996) children's series with the Kratt Brothers (PBS)
Lynn Fischer's Healthy Indulgences (late 1990s), 26 shows hosted by Lynn Fischer.
Maryland State of Mind (1994–2001), 28-episode series hosted by NPR's Scott Simon, showcasing the 13 schools of the University System of Maryland.
Newsnight Maryland, a locally produced news program that reviews the stories happening in the state of Maryland.
On Nature's Trail (1978), a television show featured Elmer and Jean Worthley observing and discussing plants growing at different locations in Baltimore County, Maryland.
On Stage at Wolf Trap (1980s), concert series.
Of Earth and Man (1970s), educational series.
Primal Grill (2008—2011) outdoor cooking series with Steven Raichlen.
The Transformation Age: Surviving a Technology Revolution with Robert X. Cringely (2007), 1 hour documentary on technology and business. A co-production with the Robert H Smith School of Business.
To the Contrary (1992–2011) Persephone Productions (PBS)
Volvo Ocean Race: sailing race around the world with host Gary Jobson
Wall $treet Week with Louis Rukeyser (1972–2002), MPT's signature long running financial information program
Wall $treet Week (with Fortune) (2002–2005), which succeeded the original program after the departure of Louis Rukeyser
Weeknight Alive! (1980s), arts series
Wimzie's House, children's series, presenting station only
Zoboomafoo (1999–2001) children's series with the Kratt Brothers and PBS in the United States; Canadian production handled by Cinar (now part of WildBrain).

Stations

The MPT stations are:

WGPT is assigned to the Pittsburgh, Pennsylvania market and elects must-carry status on satellite providers there. For the purposes of pay-television carriage, WMPT and WMPB are assigned to the Baltimore market, while WFPT and WWPB are assigned to Washington-Hagerstown and WCPB to Salisbury.

Notes:
1. Aside from their transmitters, the MPT stations (except WMPB) do not maintain any physical presence in their cities of license.
2. WMPB used the callsign WETM during its construction permit from 1967 to 1968.
3. WWPB used the -TV suffix in its callsign from its 1974 sign-on to October 15, 1976.
4. WMPT used the callsign WAPB (Annapolis) from its 1975 sign-on to July 4, 1984.
5. WGPT and WFPT were both first licensed in 1979 as translators W36AB and W62AY, respectively. They were later replaced by full-powered licenses from the same transmitter sites.

Digital television

Digital channels
The stations' digital signals are multiplexed:

WMPT / WMPB digital channels

Analog-to-digital conversion 
MPT's stations shut down their analog signals on June 12, 2009, the official date in which full-power television stations in the United States transitioned from analog to digital broadcasts under federal mandate. The station's digital channel allocations post-transition are as follows:
 WMPB shut down its analog signal, over UHF channel 67; the station's digital signal remained on its pre-transition UHF channel 29, using PSIP to display the station's virtual channel as its former UHF analog channel 67, which was among the high band UHF channels (52-69) that were removed from broadcasting use as a result of the transition.
 WMPT shut down its analog signal, over UHF channel 22; the station's digital signal remained on its pre-transition UHF channel 42, using PSIP to display the station's virtual channel as its former UHF analog channel 22.
 WCPB shut down its analog signal, over UHF channel 28; the station's digital signal relocated from its pre-transition UHF channel 56, which was among the high band UHF channels (52-69) that were removed from broadcasting use as a result of the transition, to its analog-era UHF channel 28.
 WWPB shut down its analog signal, over UHF channel 31; the station's digital signal remained on its pre-transition UHF channel 44, using PSIP to display the station's virtual channel as its former UHF analog channel 31.
 WGPT shut down its analog signal, over UHF channel 36; the station's digital signal relocated from its pre-transition UHF channel 54, which was among the high band UHF channels (52-69) that were removed from broadcasting use as a result of the transition, to its analog-era UHF channel 36.
 WFPT shut down its analog signal, over UHF channel 62; the station's digital signal remained on its pre-transition UHF channel 28, using PSIP to display the station's virtual channel as its former UHF analog channel 62, which was among the high band UHF channels (52-69) that were removed from broadcasting use as a result of the transition.

Spectrum reallocation
As a part of the repacking process following the 2016–2017 FCC incentive auction, channels 38 through 51 were removed from television broadcasting. None of MPT's stations sold their allocations, but five of them moved channels within the UHF band: WMPT moved to channel 21, WMPB to channel 22, WWPB to channel 29, WGPT to channel 26, and WCPT to channel 16.

ATSC 3.0
MPT joined the Baltimore market's ATSC 3.0 lighthouse station, hosted at WNUV, on June 24, 2021. In return, WMPT and WMPB hosts WNUV's main channel (54.1) to preserve coverage for existing ATSC 1.0 TV sets.

Awards
For 2008, MPT received 14 Emmy Award nominations from the National Capital Chesapeake Bay Chapter of the National Academy of Television Arts and Sciences (NATAS). MPT received Emmys for Eatin' Crabs Chesapeake Style, two awards for Bob the Vid Tech: The Mystery of the Missing Pizza and one for ArtWorks: Manuel Barrueco Special.

MPT received two 2008 CINE Golden Eagle Awards for The Transformation Age: Surviving a Technology Revolution with Robert X. Cringely, a coproduction of MPT/University of Maryland Robert H. Smith School of Business, and Lethal Landscapes: Canvases of the Combat Artist.

For 2007, the station received 11 nominations and won 1 National Capitol Emmy including 3 nominations for their regional The War series and 5 nominations for Outdoors Maryland. Motorweek also received the Board of Governors Award.

References

External links
MPT homepage
Maryland Public Television records at the University of Maryland Libraries

1969 establishments in Maryland
PBS member networks
Television channels and stations established in 1969
Television stations in Maryland
Companies based in Baltimore County, Maryland